Palya Bareli is a Bhil language of India. It is close to two other languages called Bareli, but not mutually intelligible with them.

References

Languages of India